William Norman Cochrane Barr  (1920-November 19, 2010)  was Dean of Connor  from 1981 to 1990.

Born in 1920, he was educated at Trinity College, Dublin and ordained in 1946. After curacies in Ballymena and Belfast he held incumbencies in Duneane, Whiterock and Derriaghy before his appointment as Dean.

References

Alumni of Trinity College Dublin
Irish Anglicans
Deans of Connor
1920 births
2010 deaths